Musée des familles ("Museum of Families") was an illustrated French literary magazine that was published in Paris from 1833 to 1900. It was founded by Émile de Girardin.

Contributors of the magazine included Alexandre Dumas, Théophile Gautier, Jules Verne, and Honoré de Balzac.

The magazine was subtitled Lectures du soir ("Readings in the Evening").

External links 
 Issues of Musée des familles in Gallica, the digital library of the BnF

1833 establishments in France
1900 disestablishments in France
Defunct literary magazines published in France
French-language magazines
Magazines established in 1833
Magazines disestablished in 1900
Magazines published in Paris